Bald Head Island may refer to:
 Bald Head Island, North Carolina
 Bald Head Island (Lake Ontario), part of Weller's Bay, a protected wildlife area in Ontario